Union Station is the inter-city railway station for Winnipeg, Manitoba, Canada. It is a grand beaux-arts structure situated near The Forks in downtown Winnipeg, and was designated a National Historic Site of Canada in 1976. The station is also a Heritage Railway Station, so designated since 1989.

History

Initial construction
Constructed between 1908 and 1911, the station was built as a joint venture between the Canadian Northern Railway, National Transcontinental, Grand Trunk Pacific Railway and the Dominion government. The first train to enter the station did so on 7 August 1911, with the official opening the following year on 24 June 1912.

Union Station was designed by Warren and Wetmore, the architects responsible for Grand Central Terminal in New York City. Designed in the Beaux-Arts style and constructed from local Tyndall limestone, Union Station was one of Western Canada's largest railway stations.

The building extends for 110 metres along Main Street, with the entrance close to the intersection of Main Street and Broadway. The building's entrance doors are located under a decorative iron canopy that projects from the austere white limestone. Atop the building is a large dome.

Use
Union Station was for many years an important transportation hub in the region. Thousands of immigrants passed through its halls, and it was home to the regional office of the Canadian National Railway which inherited the building from its predecessors. There were once several trans-border trains to Minneapolis-St. Paul, Minnesota operating out of the station.  The Great Northern Railway had its Winnipeg Limited, while the Northern Pacific Railway also had an unnamed day train.  Minneapolis, St. Paul and Sault Ste. Marie Railroad had its Winnipeger, which did not serve Union Station, terminating at Canadian Pacific's station on Higgins Avenue up until its discontinuance in 1967. All of these services were discontinued prior to Amtrak and there are no present plans to reinstate any of them.

Canadian National Railway turned over passenger rail services to Via Rail in 1978, which has operated out of Union Station ever since. At present, Union Station is used by two trains - the Toronto-Vancouver Canadian, and the Winnipeg – Churchill train.

Although it is still used as a passenger train terminal, the functions of Union Station have changed with time. For instance, the terminal building contains offices occupied by non-railway tenants. The trainshed, which includes a total of eight through tracks and four passenger platforms, houses the Winnipeg Railway Museum on two tracks and two platforms. It is a variation of Bush-type shed designed by Lincoln Bush.

Union Station is one of two major inter-city railway station buildings in Downtown Winnipeg. However, unlike Union Station, the Canadian Pacific Railway Station ceased functioning as a railway station upon the creation of Via Rail Canada in 1978 and is now used for purposes unrelated to transportation.

Renovation
During 2011, Via Rail undertook a $3 million renovation of the station, composed largely of repairs to the roof and trainshed, as well as various improvements to increase the energy efficiency of the building.

Renovations have included the installation of a new roof, the upgrade and insulation of the main roof from R0 to R25 and the replacement of low efficiency boilers with 3 high efficiency near condensing boilers. Due to renovations, the gas consumption in the building has been reduced by 82%, electrical consumption has been reduced by 25%, and water consumption has been reduced by 2 million gallons per year since 1990. The heating costs for the  building have been reduced to 67 cents per square foot / year, which is well below the requirement of $1 per square foot / year for the Manitoba eco-efficiency rating. The renovated building has received the BOMA BESt Level 2 designation. Since the environmental upgrades, the building has won the Building Owners and Managers Association of Manitoba (BOMA) 2012 Earth Award for Multi-Use Building.

A further $6.5 million in renovations were completed in 2014, including renovations to the passenger waiting areas, accessible public washrooms, improvement of the East entrance, repair and repainting of the rotunda, as well as various safety improvements.

Future plans 
Future plans call for the Winnipeg Railway Museum to be moved elsewhere in the metro area to make way for a rapid transit hub station where several routes that cross the city will meet.

Gallery

References

External links

Union Station information on Via Rail's website
Union Station at Virtual Heritage Winnipeg
NFB film for the Centennial of Union Station, "The Story of a Station"

Beaux-Arts architecture in Canada
Buildings and structures in downtown Winnipeg
Via Rail stations in Manitoba
Railway stations in Canada opened in 1911
Designated Heritage Railway Stations in Manitoba
Transport in Winnipeg
Winnipeg
Warren and Wetmore buildings
1911 establishments in Manitoba
Rail infrastructure in Winnipeg
Winnipeg
Winnipeg
Canadian Register of Historic Places in Manitoba